Union Township is a township in 
Woodbury County, Iowa, USA.

References

Townships in Woodbury County, Iowa
Townships in Iowa